Meshack Abel Mwankina (born 13 October 1987) is a Tanzanian football defender who plays for Saraswati Youth Club.

References

1987 births
Living people
Tanzanian footballers
Tanzania international footballers
Mtibwa Sugar F.C. players
Simba S.C. players
African Lyon F.C. players
Moro United F.C. players
Bandari F.C. (Kenya) players
Kenya Commercial Bank S.C. players
Polisi FC players
Lipuli F.C. players
Saraswoti Youth Club players
Association football defenders
Tanzanian expatriate footballers
Expatriate footballers in Kenya
Tanzanian expatriate sportspeople in Kenya
Expatriate footballers in Nepal
Tanzanian expatriate sportspeople in Nepal
Tanzanian Premier League players